No Kings is the second official studio album by Minneapolis hip hop collective Doomtree. It was released by Doomtree Records on November 22, 2011. "Bangarang" was released as a single from the album.

Critical reception
At Metacritic, which assigns a weighted average score out of 100 to reviews from mainstream critics, No Kings received an average score of 80% based on 8 reviews, indicating "generally favorable reviews".

City Pages included it on the "Minnesota's Best Albums of 2011" list.

Track listing

Charts

References

External links
 

2011 albums
Doomtree albums
Doomtree Records albums
Albums produced by Lazerbeak